The Samsung Gear S2 is a smartwatch developed by Samsung Electronics running Samsung's Tizen operating system. It was unveiled at IFA in 2015.

Its successor, the Samsung Gear S3, was released on November 18, 2016.

Overview 
The watch features a rotating bezel user interface and an IP68 rating for water resistance up to 1.5 meters deep in 30 minutes. It is compatible with 20mm width watch straps. It has a Super AMOLED display with a resolution of 360 x 360 pixels and a screen size of 1.2 inches. The watch has a dual-core Exynos processor running at 1 GHz. Samsung Pay can be used through NFC payment terminals.

Comparison of models

References 

Tizen-based devices
Products introduced in 2015
Smartwatches
Samsung wearable devices